Maputo Province is a province of Mozambique; the province excludes the city of Maputo (which comprises a separate province). Its capital is the city of Matola.

Geography

Maputo Province is the southernmost province of Mozambique. It borders Gaza Province to the north, the Indian Ocean to the east, the South African province of KwaZulu-Natal to the south,  Eswatini to the southwest, and the Mpumalanga province of South Africa to the west and northwest. The Maputo Bay area to the southeast of Maputo is an important conservation area with many reefs and lakes. Of particular note is the Maputo Elephant Game Reserve, which has lakes such as Lagoa Chingute and Lagoa Piti in the vicinity, and the Machangulo Private Nature Reserve further north of this in the Machangulo Peninsula. The largest river of the province, the Maputo River, running from Amsterdam, Mpumalanga in South Africa near the Eswatini border, flows into Maputo Bay to the southeast of Maputo. Also flowing into the bay are the Umbeluzi River and the Incomati River. In the fall of 1999, the Maputo, Umbeluzi, Incompati and Limpopo rivers were affected by severe rainfall, 70 percent higher than normal which caused severe flooding. The Maputo and Incomati burst their banks on 12 January 2000, directly affecting some 40,000, and flooding along the Incomati affected about 20,000 several days later.

It is protected under the Lubombo Transfrontier Conservation Area, and contains the Reserva da Inhaca.

In the northwest of the province, near the South African border is a major reservoir and dam complex, the Corumana Dam, which dams the Sabie River. The dam is under the responsibility of the water directorate, Direcção Nacional de Águas (DNA).

Districts
Maputo Province is divided into the 7 districts of:
Boane District
Magude District
Manhiça District
Marracuene District
Moamba District
Namaacha District
Matutuíne District

and the municipalities of:
Boane
Manhiça
Matola
Namaacha

Demographics
Between 2007 and 2017, the population grew by 48.2%, the fastest growing region in Mozambique. As of the 2007 census, the province had a population of 1,233,143 residents.

References

 
Provinces of Mozambique